Lingulodiniaceae is a family of dinoflagellates belonging to the order Gonyaulacales.

Genera:
 Amylax A.Meunier  
 Lingulodinium D.Wall  
 Sourniaea H.Gu, K.N.Mertens, Zhun Li & H.H.Shin

References

Gonyaulacales
Dinoflagellate families